The 1881–82 Scottish Cup – officially the Scottish Football Association Challenge Cup – was the ninth season of Scotland's most prestigious football knockout competition. A total of 147 teams entered the competition, five more than the previous record set in 1879–80. For the second season in a row, defending champions Queen's Park played Dumbarton in the final. After the original match finished in a 2–2 draw on 18 March 1882, Queen's Park won the trophy for a sixth time with a 4–1 win in the replay 1 April 1882.

Calendar

As with the previous competitions, the eighth edition of the Scottish Cup took on the format of a traditional knockout tournament. For the earlier rounds, the names of competing teams were placed into lots according to their districts and drawn into pairs. The home team for each tie was determined by the toss of a coin unless it was mutually agreed or only one of the two clubs drawn against one another had a private ground. In the event of a draw, the team who lost the toss would have the choice of ground for the replay. A similar procedure was used for subsequent rounds however, any club which had received a bye in the previous round would first be drawn against one of the winners of the previous round. The names of winning teams were placed into one lot for later rounds. The choice of venue for the final matches was reserved to the Scottish Football Association.

Both Glasgow and Edinburgh Universities were given byes to the third round.
Two teams qualified for the third round after drawing their second round replay.

Teams
All 147 teams entered the competition in the first round.

First round
Airdrie, Annbank, Clarkston, Dunblane, Dundee Harp, Dunfermline, Helensburgh Victoria, Luton and Queen of the South Wanderers received a bye to the second round. Glasgow University and Edinburgh University received a bye to the third round.

Matches

Replays

Second Replay

Sources:

Second round
Brunswick, Cartvale, Johnstone, Kilbirnie, Petershill, Stranraer and Strathmore received a bye to the third round.

Matches

Replays

Notes

Sources:

Third round
Edinburgh University, Glasgow University, Helensburgh, Hibernian, Kilmarnock Athletic, Milton of Campsie, Queen's Park, Thistle and Thornliebank received a bye to the fourth round.

Matches

Replays

Second Replay

Sources:

Fourth round
Beith, Dumbarton, Shotts, South Western and Vale of Teith received a bye to the fifth round.

Matches

Replays

Sources:

Fifth round

Matches

Replays

Sources:

Quarter-finals

Matches

Replay

Sources:

Semi-finals

Matches

Sources:

Final

Original match

Replay

See also
1881–82 in Scottish football

References

Cup
Scottish Cup seasons
Scot